Victorville is a city in Victor Valley in San Bernardino County, California. Its population as of the 2020 census was 134,810.

Victorville is the principal city of a Victor Valley–based urban area defined by the United States Census Bureau: the Victorville–Hesperia–Apple Valley urban area had a population of 355,816 as of the 2020 census, making it the 117th largest in the United States.

History
In 1858, Aaron G. Lane came to what is now known as Victorville and founded a waystation called "Lane's Crossing." For many years it provided shelter and supplies for people journeying across the desert from the east to San Bernardino. Lane's Crossing was on the Mojave River on today's Turner Road, two miles north of where Interstate 15 crosses the river. Lane was a veteran of the Mexican–American War who had had malaria during that war. Originally he migrated west to join the California gold rush, but he learned that he could make a better living selling supplies to the miners.

Lane settled in Ione, near Sutter's Mill in northern California, during those years, but migrated to San Bernardino in 1857. He settled on the Mojave River in 1858, where he established his waystation. He later sold out to Texan John Fry Miller, who changed the name of Lane's Crossing to Pioneer Station. Miller was a rancher and became involved in Mojave Valley politics, setting up the first polling place in the area at his home. That first year, ten citizens cast their votes at Lane's residence rather than making the long trip to San Bernardino.

Census records show that ten people lived in two residences on the river by 1860. Listed in Dwelling No. 703 were Aaron Lane, William R. Levick, and the Nicholson family, consisting of George, Frances, and their three children aged 9 to 13. Joseph and Mary Highmoor lived in Dwelling No. 704, with a seven-year-old girl named Anna.

The Levick, Nicholson and Highmoor families were Mormon pioneers. Highmoor established a way station called Highmoor's Crossing near today's Oro Grande bridge of the National Trails Highway (known as U.S. Route 66), over the Mojave River at what is called the Lower Narrows. The Nicholson family moved downriver a few miles and established a way station at "Point of Rocks" in today's Helendale area.

In 1867, Lafayette Meacham, a Mormon who ran a way station near today's Barstow area, made a new wagon road from his stage stop to what is now Old Town Victorville. It crossed the Mojave River at today's Sixth Street. This new road, now called Stoddard Wells Road, was a shortcut across the desert and became a popular route for muleskinners and freighters. The river crossing was called Mormon Crossing and the surrounding area became known by that name.

In the 1870s, Heber "Pete" Huntington established a stage stop, Huntington Station, at Mormon Crossing. Also a Mormon pioneer, Huntington was leader Brigham Young's nephew. Huntington later bought out the Stoddard brothers, who had a waystation halfway to today's Barstow from Victorville, and the Meachams, who ran the stage stop named Fish Ponds or Mormon Grocery.

In 1885, the newly established telegraph station at the railroad siding of "Victor", named for the California Southern Railroad's General Manager Jacob Nash Victor, was the beginning of what developed as today's Old Town Victorville. The village that sprang up around that railroad facility became known by the same name of Victor.

In 1901, at the suggestion of local postmistress Abbey Turner, the U.S. Post Office Department changed that name to Victorville to stop the postal confusion with the town of Victor, Colorado.

In 1926, U.S. Route 66 was begun, being marked in many areas on existing roads. In Victorville, US 66 is marked on D and Seventh streets, with a section of Interstate 15 going towards the Cajon Pass. It is the primary street through Old Town Victorville.

In 1940, Herman J. Mankiewicz and John Houseman wrote the first two drafts of the screenplay for the film Citizen Kane in Victorville. They worked in seclusion for 12 weeks while residing at the North Verde Ranch, now called the Kemper Campbell Ranch. The quiet ranch allowed Mankiewicz to complete his writing without the temptation of drinking, as he struggled with alcoholism.

The Victorville Army Airfield was constructed beginning in 1941. It was renamed the George Air Force Base when the U.S. Air Force was established in October 1947. After decades of service to the Air Force, in 1992 George Air Force Base was closed. Its land was turned over to other uses. Part of it is now the Southern California Logistics Airport. The former Air Force base housing area is now vacant. It forms a ghost town used for military training by troops from the U.S. Army's Fort Irwin Military Reservation. The Victorville Federal Penitentiary has been built on another part of the former air base.

The city of Victorville was officially incorporated by the State of California on September 21, 1962.

On August 14, 1977, actor Ron Haydock was struck and killed while hitchhiking near Victorville.

In 2003, the Roy Rogers and Dale Evans Museum was moved from Victorville to Branson, Missouri. It closed before 2015.

On November 3, 2007, Victorville hosted the DARPA Urban Challenge, a six-hour autonomous robot driving contest through the streets of the Southern California Logistics Airport. The $2 million first prize went to the Carnegie Mellon University team.

Geography
Victorville is the location of offices of the "Mojave Desert Branch" of the San Bernardino County government.

Victorville is bordered by Apple Valley on the east, Hesperia on the south, and Adelanto on the west. The Mojave River flows sporadically through Victorville.

The total area is 0.76% water.

Climate
The city is in the High Desert, an area known for its unique and moderate weather patterns. The National Weather Service has maintained a weather station in Victorville since 1917. Official records show that Victorville has a cool arid climate (Köppen BWk) with four distinct seasons. Due to the higher elevation and inland location of the High Desert, the climate tends to be more extreme than in the Los Angeles Basin and other Southern California lowland regions.

Winter is the region's wet season, when Victorville receives the most storms. Due to the rain shadow effect caused by the San Bernardino Mountains and San Gabriel Mountains, the rainfall received is less than in the Los Angeles basin or even the San Bernardino Valley. Temperatures tend to be cool, with overnight low temperatures dropping to or below freezing on average. While the high temperatures average around a pleasant , there are periods in which the high temperature fails to reach  or even . Snowfall and other wintry precipitation is also possible, although any snowfall tends to be very light and melt quickly; significant snowstorms as seen in the San Bernardino Mountains and San Gabriel Mountains are very rare. Black ice is also possible during the winter.

Summer days are generally hot to sweltering, with average high temperatures approaching . It is also the time of year in which Victorville, and Southern California as a whole, receives the least precipitation. The higher elevation prevents the temperatures from matching the extreme heat seen in lower desert cities such as Palm Springs or Needles. Also unlike lower desert communities, the diurnal temperature variation is greater, allowing substantial relief to occur at night with average low temperatures approaching . In the later part of the season, the average precipitation amount experiences an uptick due to the North American Monsoon bringing possible thunderstorms to the region. These thunderstorms can cause flash flooding, lightning, hail, and bring relief from the very hot summer days.

Spring is a transitional season, with warm high temperatures and low temperatures remaining quite cool. Summer-like weather usually begins to appear in May while rainfall tapers off. Autumn also has generally warm to very warm high temperatures on average, with temperatures falling from hot in September to pleasant in November, and rainfall rates increasing. Winter-like weather usually begins to appear by late November. High wind events are common in Victorville year-round and particularly during the spring; they can down power lines and cause dust storms that reduce visibility.

There is an average of 28 days annually with measurable rain. Snowfall in Victorville averages only  annually.

Demographics

2010
The 2010 United States Census reported that Victorville had a population of 115,903. The racial makeup of Victorville was 56,258 (48.5%) White (28.3% Non-Hispanic White), 19,483 (16.8%) African American, 1,665 (1.4%) Native American, 4,641 (4.0%) Asian, 489 (0.4%) Pacific Islander, 26,036 (22.5%) from other races, and 7,331 (6.3%) from two or more races. There were 55,359 Hispanic or Latino residents of any race (47.8%).

The Census reported that 110,800 people (95.6% of the population) lived in households, 341 (0.3%) lived in non-institutionalized group quarters, and 4,762 (4.1%) were institutionalized.

There were 32,558 households, out of which 17,256 (53.0%) had children under the age of 18 living in them, 17,036 (52.3%) were opposite-sex married couples living together, 6,487 (19.9%) had a female householder with no husband present, 2,397 (7.4%) had a male householder with no wife present. There were 2,478 (7.6%) unmarried opposite-sex partnerships, and 258 (0.8%) same-sex married couples or partnerships. 5,081 households (15.6%) were made up of individuals, and 1,954 (6.0%) had someone living alone who was 65 years of age or older. The average household size was 3.40. There were 25,920 families (79.6% of all households); the average family size was 3.77.

The population was spread out, with 38,023 people (32.8%) under the age of 18, 12,136 people (10.5%) aged 18 to 24, 33,479 people (28.9%) aged 25 to 44, 22,853 people (19.7%) aged 45 to 64, and 9,412 people (8.1%) who were 65 years of age or older. The median age was 29.5 years. For every 100 females, there were 100.4 males. For every 100 females age 18 and over, there were 99.1 males.

The homeowner vacancy rate was 4.9%; the rental vacancy rate was 11.1%. 66,600 people (57.5% of the population) lived in owner-occupied housing units and 44,200 people (38.1%) lived in rental housing units.

During 2009–13, Victorville had a median household income of $50,034, with 25.3% of the population living below the federal poverty line.

2000
In 2000, the city was estimated to contain 64,029 people, 20,893 households, and 15,883 families residing in the city. The racial makeup of the city was 61.1% White (47.5% Non-Hispanic White), 11.9% African American, 1.1% Native American, 3.5% Asian, 0.2% Pacific Islander, 16.3% from other races, and 6.0% from two or more races. 33.5% of the population were Hispanic or Latino of any race.

There were 20,893 households, out of which 43.8% had children under the age of 18 living with them, 54.3% were married couples living together, 16.1% had a female householder with no husband present, and 24.0% were non-families. 19.4% of all households were made up of individuals, and 8.5% had someone living alone who was 65 years of age or older. The average household size was 3.03 and the average family size was 3.47.

In the city, the population was spread out, with 34.2% under the age of 18, 8.6% from 18 to 24, 28.6% from 25 to 44, 17.4% from 45 to 64, and 11.2% who were 65 years of age or older. The median age was 30.7 years. For every 100 females, there were 93.9 males. For every 100 females age 18 and over, there were 89.2 males.

The median income for a household in the city was $66,763, and the median income for a family was $66,866. Males had a median income of $40,149 versus $26,138 for females. The per capita income for the city was $18,731. 19.24% of the population and 16.03% of families were below the poverty line. Out of the total population, 24.6% of those under the age of 18 and 10.6% of those 65 and older were living below the poverty line.

Government

Local government 
The city of Victorville operates with a council-manager form of government.

The current city council members and city manager are:
 Mayor: Debra Jones 
 Mayor pro tem: Leslie Irving 
 City council members: Elizabeth Becerra, Blanca Gomez 
 City manager: Keith C. Metzler

List of mayors 
This is a list of Victorville mayors by year. The mayor is appointed in December.
 1974–1976 Terry E. Caldwell
 1978–1980 Terry E. Caldwell
 1986–1988 Terry E. Caldwell
 1990–1992 Terry E. Caldwell
 1994–1996 Terry E. Caldwell
 1998–2000 Terry E. Caldwell
 2002–2004 Terry E. Caldwell 
 2010–2012 Ryan McEachron
 2012–2013 Jim Cox 
 2014–2020 Gloria Garcia – First Hispanic woman mayor.

State and federal 

Economy

Top employers

According to the city's 2009 Comprehensive Annual Financial Report, the top employers in the city are:

Education
The following school districts serve Victorville:

Elementary and middle school:
 Victor Elementary School District (VESD)
 Adelanto Elementary School District (AESD)

High school:
 Victor Valley Union High School District

Unified:
 Hesperia Unified School District
 Snowline Joint Unified School District

Victor Valley Community College also serves the city.

Media

Print
The Victor Valley Daily Press is published in Victorville.

Transportation
Victorville is located along BNSF Railway's Southern Transcon. Intercity rail service is provided at the Victor Valley Transportation Center. The Amtrak Southwest Chief stops in each direction daily. The Transportation Center also hosts Greyhound Lines intercity bus services. Brightline West is a long planned high-speed rail line at the Victor Valley station in the adjacent town of Apple Valley with direct service from Palmdale or Rancho Cucamonga to Las Vegas.

FlixBus stops at 14618 7th Street, with buses to several destinations, including Las Vegas, Santa Clarita, and Los Angeles.

Local bus service is provided by the Victor Valley Transit Authority.

The city is home to the Southern California Logistics Airport.

Landmarks

There are several notable areas and locations within Victorville such as Spring Valley Lake, the Old Sheriff's Office, U.S. Route 66, and the Victorville Film Archive.

Old Town Victorville 

A revitalization project started in 1995 in the ten square blocks along Historic Route 66. After years of setbacks in developing Old Town, the city, with input from residents and local business owners, created an Old Town Strategic Action Plan in 2007. In 2008, demolition of hazardous and dilapidated buildings began. In 2010, as the economy declined, the state eliminated Redevelopment Agencies which had funded the project and further work was put on indefinite hold. As of 2012, the area still had problems with crime and homelessness, and many buildings remain boarded up.

Projects include the Veteran's Memorial on the corner of Seventh Street and Forrest Avenue, the Route 66 Museum, the Transportation Center, and the Old Victor School. Several large murals have been painted on the sides of buildings in Old Town.

Filming location
Victorville has been used for commercial filming several times:

 3 Bad Men (1926), filmed northwest of Victorville and the surrounding desert;
 Passage to Marseille (1944), Victorville Army Air Field, later named George Air Force Base.
 It Came from Outer Space (1953), filmed in Victorville and the surrounding desert; Victorville served as the setting for the fictional town of "Sand Rock, Arizona".
 Grand Theft Auto (1977), starring Ron Howard filmed in Downtown Victorville.
 The Hills Have Eyes (1977) by Wes Craven
 The Hitcher (1986), starring Rutger Hauer, C. Thomas Howell, and Jennifer Jason Leigh, was filmed at the Outpost truck stop. Many local residents were used as extras.
 Lethal Weapon (1987) was filmed at El Mirage Dry Lake west of Victorville.
 From Dusk till Dawn (1996), the restaurant scene early in the movie
 Face/Off (1997), portions filmed at Southern California Logistics Airport in Victorville
 Breakdown (1997) starring Kurt Russell, filmed in downtown Victorville
 Contact (1997), also partially filmed in Victorville, with some local residents used as extras.
 Play It to the Bone (1999) filmed partly in The New Reflections concert venue in Downtown
 Kill Bill: Volume 2 (2004) was filmed in The New Reflections as well
 The Fast and the Furious: Tokyo Drift (2006) was partially filmed in Victorville.On Cinema Sky (2015) included a dinner scene filmed in Emma Jean's Holland Burger Cafe in Victorville.

Neighborhoods
 

Sunset Ridge

Notable people

 Armida, Mexican actress, singer, dancer and vaudevillian
 Earl W. Bascom, rodeo pioneer, cowboy artist and sculptor, Rodeo Hall of Fame inducteeWho's Who in California, Historical Society 1993ProRodeo Sports News "Bascom Dies at 89" (September 17, 1995)
 Harold Budd, Los Angeles–born ambient composer
 Matt Chapman, Major League Baseball infielder
 Jesse Chavez, Major League Baseball pitcher
Ryan Garcia, professional boxer
 Amir Garrett, professional baseball pitcher
John W. Henry, businessman
 Patty Jenkins, writer and director of 2017 film Wonder Woman''
 Trever Keith, musician, and front man of punk-pop group Face to Face
 Raven, drag queen and performer
 Tony Renna, racing driver 
 Dominick Reyes, MMA fighter and UFC light heavyweight title challenger
 Stevie Ryan, writer, comedian, and star of Stevie TV
LaKeith Stanfield, actor
Jason Vargas, professional baseball pitcher
Travis Van Winkle, actor

See also

Victorville Army Airfield auxiliary fields
List of U.S. cities with large Hispanic populations
List of Mexican-American communities

References

External links

 Victorville city government site

 
Cities in the Mojave Desert
Cities in San Bernardino County, California
Victor Valley
Populated places established in 1895
1895 establishments in California
Incorporated cities and towns in California